Triple superphosphate is a component of fertilizer that primarily consists of monocalcium phosphate, Ca(H2PO4)2.  Triple superphosphate is obtained by treating phosphate rock with phosphoric acid.  Traditional routes for extraction of phosphate rock uses sulfuric acid gives single superphosphate, an approximate 1:1 mixture of Ca(H2PO4)2 and CaSO4 phosphogypsum). Double superphosphate refers to some average of triple- and single superphosphate, resulting from the extraction of phosphate rock with a mixture of phosphoric and sulfuric acids.

Many fertilizers are derived from triple superphosphate, e.g. by blending with ammonium sulfate and potassium chloride. Typical fertilizer-grade triple superphosphate contains 45% P2O5eq, single superphosphate 20% P2O5eq.

References

Food additives
Phosphates
Calcium compounds
Inorganic fertilizers